This page lists all of the numbered county roads in United Counties of Prescott and Russell, Ontario.

 
Prescott